Public Counsel is the nation's largest provider of pro bono legal services. Founded in 1970 by the Beverly Hills Bar Association, Public Counsel delivers free legal and social services to abused and abandoned children, homeless families and veterans, senior citizens, victims of consumer fraud, and nonprofit organizations serving low-income communities. Initially called the Beverly Hills Bar Association Law Foundation, it was the first bar-sponsored public interest law firm in the United States.

The substantive areas in which Public Counsel works include Veterans Advocacy, Appellate Law and Federal Pro Se, Community Development, Early Care and Education Law, Homelessness Prevention Law, Children's Rights (including Adoptions and Guardianships), Consumer Law (including Bankruptcy), Immigrants' Rights, and Opportunity Under Law.

In 1977, the Los Angeles County Bar Association joined the Beverly Hills Bar Association as a sponsor of the Law Foundation. This joint endeavor resulted not only in a name change to Public Counsel, but also in an expansion of the organization's purposes and goals. Direct involvement in public interest litigation was coupled with a mandate to mobilize and coordinate pro bono efforts of the Los Angeles legal community to serve the poor.

It is the public interest law office of the Los Angeles County and Beverly Hills Bar Associations and the Southern California affiliate of the Lawyers' Committee for Civil Rights Under Law. Its full-time staff of 140 (including over 70 staff attorneys), along with over 5,000 volunteer lawyers, law students, and legal professionals, assist more than 30,000 children, youth, families, and community organizations every year.

References

External links
Official website

Law firms based in Los Angeles
Law firms established in 1970
1970 establishments in California
Legal aid in the United States
Non-profit organizations based in Los Angeles
Organizations based in California